Omri Boehm is an Israeli philosopher and associate professor of philosophy at the New School for Social Research. He is known for his interpretation of the Binding of Isaac (Genesis 22), work on Kant, and writing on Israel and Zionism.

Life and career

Boehm grew up in the Galilee. He studied at the Adi Lautman Interdisciplinary Programme for Outstanding Students at Tel Aviv University and earned his PhD at Yale University. He did a post-doc at Ludwig Maximilian University of Munich in 2010. He is associate professor of philosophy at the New School for Social Research based in New York City.

Boehm’s first book, The Binding of Isaac: a Religious Model of Disobedience, argues (contending that the verse in which God tells Abraham not to kill Isaac is a later addition) that Abraham disobeyed God’s command to sacrifice his son Isaac, and disobedience rather than obedience is the corner of Jewish faith. His second book, Kant’s Critique of Spinoza, argues that the Critique of Pure Reason needs to be read as an answer to Spinoza’s Ethics. His latest book, Haifa Republic: A Democratic Future for Israel, develops a model for bi-national Zionism. His writings have appeared in the New York Times, Washington Post, Haaretz and Die Zeit, among others.

Books
 Haifa Republic: A Democratic Future for Israel 
 Israel – eine Utopie (German Edition) 
 Kant's Critique of Spinoza 
 The Binding of Isaac: a Religious Model of Disobedience

References

1979 births
Living people
Israeli philosophers
Israeli writers